The 1988 Japanese motorcycle Grand Prix was the first round of the 1988 Grand Prix motorcycle racing season. It took place on the weekend of 25–27 March 1988 at the Suzuka Circuit.

500 cc race report
Tadahiko Taira was on pole of the 5-column grid (it became 4-columns in 1990). Wayne Rainey got the start and lead through the first turns, with Kevin Schwantz, Wayne Gardner and Christian Sarron behind. Schwantz took the inside of the hairpin, but Rainey dove back under and got him back on the exit; Schwantz succeeded in taking the lead on Spoon.

At the end of the 1st lap, it was Schwantz and Gardner, then a gap to Toshihiko Honma (riding #46) and Sarron. Gardner and Schwantz swapped the lead many times.

Eddie Lawson and Niall Mackenzie moved through the field to 3rd and 4th. Norihiko Fujiwara lowsided at the hairpin.

On the last lap Gardner ran off the track and stayed on, but lost any chance of winning the race.

500 cc classification

References

Japanese motorcycle Grand Prix
Japanese
Motorcycle
March 1988 sports events in Asia